Cradle of Genius is a 1961 Irish short documentary film directed by Paul Rotha on the history of the Abbey Theatre. It was nominated for an Academy Award for Best Documentary Short.

Cast
 Eileen Crowe
 Maureen Delany
 Barry Fitzgerald
 Siobhán McKenna

References

External links

1961 films
1961 documentary films
1961 short films
English-language Irish films
Irish short documentary films
Irish black-and-white films
1960s short documentary films
Films directed by Paul Rotha
1960s English-language films